The 2002 CHA Men's Ice Hockey Tournament was played between March 14 and March 16, 2002 at Dwyer Arena in Lewiston, New York. Wayne State defeated Alabama-Huntsville 5–4 in overtime in the championship game to win the tournament for the second consecutive year.

Format
The tournament featured six team for the first time. The top two teams from the regular season received byes to the semifinals where they played the winners from the quarterfinal games. The two semifinal winners met in the championship game on March 16, 2002.

Conference standings
Note: GP = Games played; W = Wins; L = Losses; T = Ties; PTS = Points; GF = Goals For; GA = Goals Against

Bracket

Note: * denotes overtime period(s)

Tournament awards

All-Star team
Goaltender: Mark Byrne (Alabama-Huntsville)
Defensemen: Tyler Butler (Alabama-Huntsville), Tyler Kindle (Wayne State)
Forwards: Andy Berg (Air Force), Steve Charlebois (Alabama-Huntsville), Jason Durbin (Wayne State)

MVP
Dustin Kingston (Wayne State)

References

External links
College Hockey America tournament history

CHA Men's Ice Hockey Tournament
Cha Men's Ice Hockey Tournament
College sports in New York (state)